This list shows equipment of Soviet Ground Forces in 1991.

Infantry equipment

Helmets

Body Armor

The first use of body armor in the USSR began as a steel breastplate. introduced at the end of 1935, the SS-36 was made from IZ-2, a steel alloy. it came in a 2mm and 3mm configuration. the 2mm version weighed 2-2.5kg and could stop penetration from 850 meters away, while the 3mm weighed 4-5kg and was able to survive a shot within 350-400 meters. Several redesigns were implemented: CH-38, CH-39/SNSHCH-39, CH-40, CH-40A, CH-42/SSHN-42, and PZ-ZIF-20. 

After World War 2, development of a new body armor would begin in 1954 and begin production in 1957. The 6B1 armor was designed for shrapnel protection, instead of bullet protection like its predecessor. This decision was based on discoveries made during the Korean war, where it was discovered that 80% of combat losses were caused by shrapnel, and only 20% were from small arms. the 6B1 was made up of hexagonal AMg7c aluminum plates packed in a vest made from Avizent nylon aviation fabric with a cotton quilted lining. it weighed 5.2kg with a thickness of 6mm on the chest, 5mm on the abdomen, and 4mm on the back.

The Red Army would not receive an upgrade until the introduction of the Zh-81/6B2 in 1981. weighing 4.8kg and made of overlapping 1.25mm steel plates and 30 layers of TSVM fabric.

Small arms

Revolver and Pistols

Submachine guns

Semi-automatic and bolt-action rifles

Assault rifles and other automatic rifles

Designated marksman and sniper rifles

Light and heavy machine guns

Anti-Tank rifles

Combat knives and bayonets

Flares and Smokes

Launchers

Rocket-propelled grenade launchers

Recoilless Rifles

Man-portable air-defense systems

Anti-tank guided missiles

Land mines

Anti-tank mines

Flamethrower

Mortars

Hand grenades

Vehicles

Tanks

Infantry fighting vehicles 
Soviet Union had over 24,000 infantry fighting vehicles in service in 1990

Self-propelled guns

Towed motars and anti-tank guns

Towed Artillery

Anti-aircraft tanks and missile systems

Anti-aircraft guns

Rocket artillery

Tactical ballistic missiles

Armored personnel carriers
By 1990 Soviet army had about 70,000 armored personnel carriers in service

Reconnaissance vehicles
Soviet army had about 3,500 reconnaissance vehicles in service in 1990.

Unarmored trucks and utility vehicles

References

Military equipment of the Soviet Union
Soviet Union
Equipment